Joan Elise Robinson Acker (March 18, 1924June 22, 2016) was an American sociologist, researcher, writer and educator. She joined the University of Oregon faculty in 1967. Acker is considered one of the leading analysts regarding gender and class within the second wave of feminism.

Education 
Acker was born in Illinois in 1924. She received her bachelor's degree from Hunter College, her master's from the University of Chicago, and her Ph.D. from the University of Oregon.

Career 
Acker is best known for her theories on the relationship between race, class, and gender. She discusses this relationship in several of her publications, including her 2006 book Class Questions: Feminist Answers. Acker describes the need to think about race, class, and gender not as separate entities but as "intersecting systems of oppression."

Acker was professor of sociology at the University of Oregon until her retirement in 1993. In 1973, Acker founded the Center for the Study of Women in Society at the University of Oregon. She was also professor at The Swedish Center for Working Life. She successfully helped to raise pay wages for low-wage jobs in Oregon while serving on a state task force from 1981-1983. She also served as co-editor of the academic journals Gender & Society and Gender, Organisation and Work. In recognition of her scholarship, Acker received the American Sociological Association's Career of Distinguished Scholarship Award in 1993 and the Jessie Bernard Award for feminist scholarship in 1989.

Later life and legacy
She died on June 22, 2016 at the age of 92.

Selected works

Books

Chapters in books

Journal articles 
Acker, Joan (1990). "Hierarchies, Jobs, Bodies: A Theory of Gendered Organizations". Gender and Society. 4 (2): 139–158. ISSN 0891-2432. 
Acker, Joan (2006-08-01). "Inequality Regimes: Gender, Class, and Race in Organizations". Gender & Society. 20 (4): 441–464. doi:10.1177/0891243206289499. ISSN 0891-2432.

References

External links
Joan Acker from the University of Oregon's Department of Sociology
Joan Acker from the Center for the Study of Women in Society
"Joan Acker’s Feminist Historical-Materialist Theory of Class" from Monthly Review

1924 births
2016 deaths
American sociologists
American women sociologists
American women's rights activists
Feminist studies scholars
Hunter College alumni
University of Chicago alumni
University of Oregon alumni
University of Oregon faculty
Scientists from Illinois
21st-century American women educators
21st-century American educators